The Glenrose Rehabilitation Hospital is located in Edmonton, Alberta, Canada. The Glenrose opened in 1964, and offers services to children and adults on an inpatient, outpatient and outreach basis. The hospital offers assessment, treatment, consultation and technology services, as well as education for patients and families through its clinics and services.

In addition to rehabilitation services for all age groups, areas of focus also include mental health and psychiatric services for children and seniors, as well as cardiac rehabilitation for adults. Specialized technology enhances patient care in programs such as the Syncrude Centre for Motion and Balance, I CAN Centre for Assistive Technology, Alberta Caregiver College, Cochlear Implant Service, Telehealth, Seating Service, Prosthetics and Orthotics, and Scoliosis Clinic.

Research
Glenrose rehabilitation research aims to improve the quality of life for people of all ages. Themes of research include:
Assistive technology to assess and treat people with disabilities
Helping children with developmental disorders through better understanding, assessment and care
Improving function in persons with chronic conditions
Anticipating the needs of an aging population

References

External links
Glenrose Rehabilitation Hospital
The Glenrose Foundation

Hospital buildings completed in 1964
Hospitals in Edmonton
Hospitals established in 1964